Antispila hydrangaeella is a species of moth of the family Heliozelidae. It is widespread in the eastern United States, including Georgia, Illinois, Kentucky and North Carolina. However, research suggests that two species might be involved under this name.

The larvae feed on Hydrangea arborea. They mine the leaves of their host plant. Mines from the North Carolina population have the form of long galleries, often following a vein and ending in a blotch with greenish to brown frass. The mines from Georgia are different. The early gallery mine is much contorted in a small area and contains black frass. It ends in an elongate mine with blackish dispersed frass.

References

Moths described in 1874
Heliozelidae